In mathematics, particularly -analog theory, the Ramanujan theta function generalizes the form of the Jacobi theta functions, while capturing their general properties.  In particular, the Jacobi triple product takes on a particularly elegant form when written in terms of the Ramanujan theta.  The function is named after mathematician Srinivasa Ramanujan.

Definition
The Ramanujan theta function is defined as

The Jacobi triple product identity then takes the form

Here, the expression  denotes the -Pochhammer symbol. Identities that follow from this include

and

and

This last being the Euler function, which is closely related to the Dedekind eta function. The Jacobi theta function may be written in terms of the Ramanujan theta function as:

Integral representations

We have the following integral representation for the full two-parameter form of Ramanujan's theta function:

This leads to several special case integrals for constants defined by these functions when  (cf. theta function explicit values). In particular, we have that 

and that

Application in string theory
The Ramanujan theta function is used to determine the critical dimensions in Bosonic string theory, superstring theory and M-theory.

References

 
 
 
 
 

Q-analogs
Elliptic functions
Theta functions
Srinivasa Ramanujan